Deborah (Debbie) Cameron (born September 14, 1958 in Miami, Florida) is a Danish-American singer of Bahamian descent who has had a career in music in Denmark.

Her career started in 1976, when she was awarded the prize "Most promising student" at the Music School at the University of Miami. In 1978, she went to Copenhagen, where her mother Etta already lived. In 1979 she was a prominent backing singer for Tommy Seebach at his participating for Denmark in the Eurovision Song Contest 1979 with the song "Disco Tango". She again represented Denmark in the Eurovision Song Contest 1981, duetting with Tommy Seebach. They performed the song "Krøller eller ej" (Curls or not), finishing 11th with 41 points.

Discography

LPs
 Debbie Cameron (http://rateyourmusic.com/release/album/debbie_cameron/debbie_cameron/)
 New York Date
 Be With Me
 Brief Encounter, duet, with Richard Boone
 Debbie Cameron
 Maybe We, with the band Buki Yamaz

Singles 
 "Greenback Dollar" / "I Don`t Wanna See You Cry" (http://www.45cat.com/record/1a00639443)
 "Call Me Tonight"
 "Game of My Life"
 "You To Me Are Everything"
 "Glad That's It's Over"
 "So-Le-La"
 "Accepted By Society"
 "Krøller eller ej", (Curls or not) duet with Tommy Seebach
 "Jeg en gård mig bygge vil" (I want to build a Farm)
 "I See the Moon" (AUS #72)
 "Stuck On You"
 "Copenhagen"
 "Sideshow"
 "Boogie Woogie Rendez-Vous"

Valentinos 
 Disco Dance Party

Vocals: Debbie Cameron, Sanne Salomonsen & Michael Elo

Soundtrack 
Soundtrack of the film Den Eneste Ene (The One and Only)

Filmography 
She has participated in the Danish film  Hodja fra Pjort (Hodja from Pjort) in 1985.
She also played herself in the Norwegian film De blå ulvene (The blue wolves) in 1993.

References

1958 births
American people of Bahamian descent
American emigrants to Denmark
Eurovision Song Contest entrants for Denmark
20th-century Danish women singers
Eurovision Song Contest entrants of 1981
Living people
University of Miami Frost School of Music alumni
English-language singers from Denmark